Bloomberg Distinguished Professorships were established as part of a $350 million investment by Michael Bloomberg, Hopkins Class of 1964, to Johns Hopkins University in 2013.  Fifty faculty members, ten from Johns Hopkins University and forty recruited from institutions worldwide, will be chosen for these endowed professorships based on their research, teaching, service, and leadership records. In December 2021, it was announced that the program would double in size, with an additional fifty professors bringing the total to one hundred scholars, made possible by a new investment by Michael Bloomberg. With recruitment beginning in 2022, the majority of the new professors will be recruited to work in clusters. These faculty-developed interdisciplinary clusters will recruit Bloomberg Distinguished Professors and junior faculty to Johns Hopkins University with the aim of conducting transformational research in crucial areas.

The Bloomberg Distinguished Professorship program is directed and managed by Johns Hopkins University Vice Provost for Research, Dr. Denis Wirtz. As of January 2022, 54 Bloomberg Distinguished Professorships have been announced.

Purpose 
The professorships will create interdisciplinary connections and collaborations across Johns Hopkins University, train and mentor undergraduate and graduate students, and strengthen the university's leadership in research fields of international interest. Each of the Bloomberg Distinguished Professors will be appointed in at least two divisions or disciplines. The program aims to bridge traditional research disciplines in order to tackle complex problems such as cancer, urban poverty, and health disparities.

Bloomberg Distinguished Professors

Former Bloomberg Distinguished Professors

Clusters 
Advancing Racial Equity in Health, Housing, and Education

Artificial Intelligence and Society

Climate, Resilience, and Health

Brain Resilience Across the Lifespan

Hub for Imaging and Quantum Technologies

Epigenome Sciences

Preparing and Responding to Emerging Pandemics

Knowledge to Action and the Business of Health

References

Distinguished Professorships
Professorships